The 2000 CONCACAF Men's Pre-Olympic Tournament was the tenth edition of the CONCACAF Pre-Olympic Tournament, the quadrennial, international, age-restricted football tournament organized by CONCACAF to determine which men's under-23 national teams from the North, Central America and Caribbean region qualify for the Olympic football tournament. It was held in the United States, from 21 and 30 April 2000.

Honduras won the tournament with a 2–1 final win over the United States. As the top two teams, Honduras and the United States qualified for the 2000 Summer Olympics in Australia as CONCACAF representatives.

Qualification

All 41 CONCACAF nations entered the competition, and with the hosts United States qualifying automatically, the other 40 teams competed in the qualifying competition to determine the remaining five spots in the final tournament.
First round: A total of 12 teams played home-and-away over two legs in six ties. The six winners advanced to the second round.
Second round: A total of 14 teams played home-and-away over two legs in seven ties. The seven winners advanced to the third round.
Third round: A total of 11 teams were divided into two groups of four (Group A and B) and one group of three (Group C). In each group, teams played against each other once in a single round-robin format, for a total of three matches per team in Group A and B; two for Group C. The top two teams in Group A and B; and winner of Group C of each of the six groups advance to the final round.

Qualified teams
The following teams qualified for the final tournament.

1 Only final tournament.

Venue
The matches were played in Hershey.

Squads

Each team has to submit a list of 18-man (two players have to be goalkeepers).

Final round

Group D

Group E

Knockout stage

Bracket

Semi-finals
The semi-final winners qualified for the 2000 Summer Olympics.

Third place play-off

Final

Final ranking

Qualified teams for Summer Olympics
The following two teams from CONCACAF qualified for the 2000 Summer Olympics.

1 Bold indicates champions for that year. Italic indicates hosts for that year.

References

External links
 RSSSF.com – Games of the XXVII. Olympiad | Football Qualifying Tournament

 
2000
CONCACAF Men's Olympic Qualifying Tournament
Oly
Football qualification for the 2000 Summer Olympics
CONCACAF Men's Pre-Olympic Tournament